Tizoxanide, also known as desacetyl-nitazoxanide, is a thiazolide and an antiparasitic agent that occurs as a metabolite of nitazoxanide in humans through hydrolysis.  Tizoxanide may undergo further metabolism via conjugation into tizoxanide glucuronide.

References

Nitrothiazoles
Salicylamides
Human drug metabolites